Carabus albrechti freyi is a subspecies of ground beetle in the family Carabidae that is endemic to Sado Island of Japan.

References

albrechti freyi
Beetles described in 1932
Endemic fauna of Japan